The Open Party is a Finnish political party registered on 1 March 2021. 

The party was founded in 2020 when its founder, resigned from the Finnish Pirate Party due to disagreements and founded a new city council group in Helsinki. 

According to Pennanen the Open Party operates outside the traditional left–right spectrum. Additionally the party has claimed to be willing to work based on the best possible scientific knowledge and cooperate with all kinds of parties.

The party took part in the municipal election in 2021 but failed to gain any seats.

References

External links  
 

Direct democracy parties
Political parties in Finland
Political parties established in 2021
2021 establishments in Finland